The Kaladan River (also Kysapnadi, Beino, Bawinu and Kolodyne) is a river in eastern Mizoram State of India, and in Chin State and Rakhine State of western Myanmar. The Kaladan River is called the Chhimtuipui River in India. It forms the international border between India and Burma between 22° 47′ 10" N (where its tributary, the Tiau River, joins it) and 22° 11′ 06" N.

History
Kaladan was an entry point to Mizoram from the seaport of Sittwe in 1904. Kaladan is Mizoram's largest river and it flows through its southeastern region.

Geography

The river arises in central Chin State as the Timit, and flows south and is soon joined by the Chal, after which it is known as the Boinu River. It continues south until just before it is joined by the Twe River at 22° 08′ 40″ N 93° 34′ 30″ E, when it swings west. It continues west until 22° 05′ 20″ N 93° 14′ 12″ E, when it heads northwest. At 22° 11′ 06″ N 93° 09′ 29″ E, below Mount Phabipa, it turns north and becomes the international border between India and Myanmar. It flows north to 22° 47′ 09″ N 93° 05′ 47″ E, where the international border continues north along the Tyao River, and the Boinu heads northwest into Mizoram State, at which point it is known as the Kaladan.

At 22° 56′ 21″ N 92° 58′ 55″ E it reaches its northernmost point, and turns south west, is joined by the Tuichong River from the right and then heads south. The Kaladan is joined from the right by the Mat River at  22° 43′ 39″ N, 92° 54′ 46″ E.  It continues south and is joined by the Kawrthingdeng River from the right.  It again enters Chin State, at Raithaw Ferry,  22° 03′ 40″ N 92° 51′ 05″ E, just northwest of Khenkhar.  The Mi River joins from the left at 21° 06′ 56″ N 92° 57′ 42″ E.  At Ngame the river enters the Rakhine State of Myanmar and continues south to Sittwe where it enters the Bay of Bengal.

Development
At present, the Kaladan is the fifth largest river in the world that is completely unfragmented by dams anywhere in its catchment, behind only the Fly, Mamberamo and Sepik in New Guinea and the Pechora in Russia. Nonetheless, the governments of India and Myanmar are working on a US$500 million, Kaladan Multi-Modal Transit Transport Project that will facilitate trade between the two nations. The project includes the construction of the US$120 million deepwater Sittwe Port at the mouth of the river, dredging of the Kaladan River to enable cargo vessels to navigate the river from Sittwe to Mizoram, the construction of a river port at Paletwa, as well as the widening and upgrade of highways between Paletwa and Myeikwa on the Indo-Myanmar border. India undertook the development of the 158 km river boat route from Sittwe seaport to the Inland Water Terminal (IWT) and hydropower project at Paletwa jetty via the Kaladan River in Myanmar. River dredging and a jetty upgrade were completed in June 2017. There is at least one river lock for navigation. The project will open up not only Mizoram but all of India's northeastern states as hinterland for the Sittwe Port. Construction for the port started in 2010 and is expected to be completed by mid-2020.

Development of the river is also being negotiated with the Shwe Gas Project for economic enhancement

See also
 Kaladan Multi-Modal Transit Transport Project
 East-West Industrial Corridor Highway, Arunachal Pradesh
 Arunachal Border Highway
 Asian Highway Network
 India-Myanmar-Thailand Friendship Highway

References

External links

 "Boinu Hydroelectric Project (640 MW)", Ministry of Power, Government of India
 Kaladan.com - news covering Indo-Myanmar Kaladan project

 
Rivers of Myanmar
Rivers of Mizoram
International rivers of Asia
India–Myanmar border
Bay of Bengal
Rakhine State
Sittwe
Rivers of India